The 2014 Supercopa Argentina Final was the 3rd edition of the Supercopa, an annual football match contested by the winners of the Argentine Primera División and Copa Argentina competitions. Huracán beat River Plate 1–0 in San Juan and won the Argentine Supercup. As champions, Huracán qualified to the 2015 Copa Sudamericana.

Qualified teams

Match

Details

Statistics

References 

2015 in Argentine football
2014
s
s